Factory 449: a theatre collective is a not-for-profit theatre company based in Washington, D.C.   Factory 449's mission is to maintain an ensemble of multi-disciplinary artists and professionals who are dedicated to the collaborative process of creating "theatre as event".  The members of this collective will assume roles involved in the development of new productions, affording artists the opportunity to write, act, direct and produce.

Company members
 Rick Hammerly, Producing Artistic director
 Gillian Shelly, managing director
 Jesse Achtenberg
 Debbi Arseneaux
 Sara Barker
 Tom Carman
 Felicia Curry
 Brian Hemmingsen
 Lisa Hodsoll
 Nanna Ingvarsson
 Amy McWilliams
 Jennifer Phillips
 Karin Rosnizeck
 Greg Stevens
 Hunter Styles
 Joey Walls
 David Lamont Wilson

Production history
2009–2010

4.48 Psychosis by Sarah Kane, Capital Fringe Festival
4.48 Psychosis by Sarah Kane, Warehouse Theatre
Factory Made: a reading series, Church Street Theatre and Human Rights Campaign

2010–2011

Magnificent Waste by Caridad Svich, Kennedy Center Page-to-Stage Festival
The Saint Plays by Erik Ehn (including World Premiere of The Monkey Seller), Church Street Theatre
Our Wide Wide Sea (Mar Nuestro) by Alberto Pedro, Translated by Caridad Svich, Intersections Arts Festival at Atlas Performing Arts Center
Magnificent Waste by Caridad Svich (World Premiere), Mead Theatre Lab at Flashpoint

2011–2012

Factory Made 2: a reading series
The Ice Child by Lisa Hodsoll, Rick Hammerly & Hunter Styles (World Premiere), Mead Theatre Lab at Flashpoint

Awards and honors
 2011 John Aniello Award for Outstanding Emerging Theatre Company
 Cultural Development Corporation Award for resident theatre company in 2011–2012 Mead Theatre Lab Program
 Cultural Development Corporation and Creative Communities Fund Award for resident theatre company in 2010–2011 Mead Theatre Lab Program
 Best Play, "4.48 Psychosis", DC Theatre Scene, Audience Choice Awards, 2009
 Best Drama, "4.48 Psychosis", Theatremania's Pick of the Fringe, Capital Fringe Festival 2009
 Best Overall Production, "4.48 Psychosis", Theatremania's Pick of the Fringe, Capital Fringe Festival 2009
 Official Selection, United Nations Week 2009

References

 Washington Business Journal: "Curtain rises on new theatre companies in D.C. area"
 The Washington Post

External links
 Factory449.org

Theatre companies in Washington, D.C.